Maybe Memories is a compilation album by American emo band the Used. It was released on July 15, 2003 and has since been certified platinum. The album consists of live songs from their self-titled album, demos from Demos from the Basement, and previously unreleased material.

Track listing

Personnel 

The Used
 Bert McCracken – vocals
 Branden Steineckert – drums
 Quinn Allman – guitar
 Jeph Howard – bass

Visuals
 Justin Wambolt-Reynolds – design

Technical and production – Album
 John Feldmann – production, engineering, mixing
 Mark Blewett – additional engineering
 Joe Gastwirt – mastering

Technical and production – Video
 Evan Aaronson – producer, editor, director
 Paul Heiman – editor
 Hello Media – producer, director
 John Feldmann – audio mixing
 Hello Media – producer, editor
 Ken Blaustein – additional camera work
 Seth Manheimer – additional camera work
 The Used – additional camera work
 David May – producer
 Penny Marciano – production director
 Raena Winscott – graphic coordinator
 Spencer Chrislu – DVD authoring
 Craig Aaronson – DVD authoring
 David Dieckman – DVD authoring

Managerial
 Craig Aaronson – executive producer, A&R

Charts and certifications

Weekly charts

Certifications

Release history

References

External links

Maybe Memories at YouTube (streamed copy where licensed)

2003 compilation albums
2003 live albums
2003 video albums
Live video albums
Music video compilation albums
Reprise Records compilation albums
Reprise Records live albums
Reprise Records video albums
The Used albums
Albums produced by John Feldmann